Kaitaia is a town in the Far North District of New Zealand, at the base of the Aupouri Peninsula, about 160 km northwest of Whangārei. It is the last major settlement on State Highway 1. Ahipara Bay, the southern end of Ninety Mile Beach, is 5 km west.

The main industries are forestry and tourism.

The name Kaitāia means ample food, kai being the Māori word for food.

The Muriwhenua are a group of six northern Māori iwi occupying the northernmost part of the North Island surrounding Kaitaia.

History and culture

European settlement

The Kaitaia Mission Station was established between 1833 and 1834 after a series of visits by Church Missionary Society (CMS) representatives including Samuel Marsden, and at different times, Joseph Matthews and William Gilbert Puckey. Puckey and Matthews had married two sisters, Matilda and Mary Ann Davis respectively, (daughters of Richard Davis, a lay missioner based at Waimate North). They formed a tight band, initially living together in raupo huts, and then in houses they built.

As Puckey and the sisters were fluent in Maori, (Puckey having arrived in New Zealand in 1819 with his father, William Puckey, and the Davis family in 1823), they spoke Maori when together, to help Joseph Matthews pick up the language. Both families grew and intermarried, forming the basis of the early Pakeha settler community. At one point, the Church Missionary Society decided that either Puckey or Matthews should move to a new location to the south to facilitate the spread of the word, but Nōpera Panakareao wrote a heartfelt letter to the CMS committee, pleading not to take away 'one of the two candlesticks'.

In February 1841, about 500 Maori were present at a CMS service. In 1852 arguments developed between one chief and his tribe, however the impact of the missionaries meant that the old ways of settling disputes had passed.

Richard Matthews, the brother of Rev. Joseph Matthews, arrived in the Bay of Islands in December 1835 and for a time, joined his brother in Kaitaia. Richard Matthews had been a lay missionary on the second voyage of HMS Beagle with Charles Darwin. Richard Matthews served the CMS as a lay catechist at Kaitaia. In 1838 he married Johanna Blomfield, the sister of Mrs Martha Blomfield Clarke, whose husband George was a CMS missionary at Te Waimate mission. In 1840 Richard and Johanna Matthews helped set up a missionary station at Whanganui.

There were plans to extend the Okaihau Branch railway to Kaitaia and construction was started in the 1920s, but with the line nearly complete to Rangiahua, a review in 1936 determined that the line would not be viable and construction was abandoned. The line terminated in Okaihau until it was closed on 1 November 1987. D 221, a steam tank locomotive, has been on static display at Centennial Park since 1967.

Marae

Kaitaia has four Ngāti Kahu marae:
 Karikari Marae is affiliated with Te Whānau Moana.
 Mangataiore Marae is affiliated with Ngāti Taranga.
 Ōturu Marae and Kia Mataara meeting house is affiliated with Ngāi Tohianga.
 Te Paatu Marae and Piri ki Te Paatu meeting house is affiliated with Te Paatu ki Pamāpūria.

21st century 
In October 2020, a fire occurred at the former Kaitaia Bowling Club on Matthews Avenue. Alarms were raised at 6:01am on Friday. The fire was caused by an electrical fault that had sparked in the kitchen area on the upper floor, causing the northern half of the building to burn. The building, prior to the blaze, was used as a residential dwelling. 

A few months later in March 2021, the building was set on fire again, causing the entire building to set ablaze. Alarms were raised at around 2:30pm. Police suspected that the blaze was 'deliberately lit'. The building was demolished upon the closing of the property.

Demographics
Statistics New Zealand describes Kaitaia as a small urban area.

Kaitaia had a population of 5,871 at the 2018 New Zealand census, an increase of 984 people (20.1%) since the 2013 census, and an increase of 669 people (12.9%) since the 2006 census. There were 1,881 households, comprising 2,799 males and 3,072 females, giving a sex ratio of 0.91 males per female, with 1,590 people (27.1%) aged under 15 years, 1,179 (20.1%) aged 15 to 29, 2,196 (37.4%) aged 30 to 64, and 909 (15.5%) aged 65 or older.

Ethnicities were 49.9% European/Pākehā, 65.9% Māori, 7.9% Pacific peoples, 5.2% Asian, and 1.2% other ethnicities. People may identify with more than one ethnicity.

The percentage of people born overseas was 9.6, compared with 27.1% nationally.

Of those people who chose to answer the census's question about religious affiliation, 36.7% had no religion, 41.5% were Christian, 10.4% had Māori religious beliefs, 1.0% were Hindu, 0.3% were Muslim, 0.7% were Buddhist and 1.2% had other religions.

Of those at least 15 years old, 348 (8.1%) people had a bachelor or higher degree, and 1,203 (28.1%) people had no formal qualifications. 201 people (4.7%) earned over $70,000 compared to 17.2% nationally. The employment status of those at least 15 was that 1,452 (33.9%) people were employed full-time, 531 (12.4%) were part-time, and 483 (11.3%) were unemployed.

Climate

Kaitaia has a humid subtropical climate (Cfbl) according to the Trewartha climate classification system or an oceanic climate (Cfb) according to Köppen system. Summers are usually warm, while winters are usually wet and mild. Precipitation is heavy year round in the form of rain, which peaks during the months of May - September.

Transport

InterCity operates a daily bus service to and from Auckland via Kerikeri. Community Business & Environment Centre (CBEC) runs a service called Busabout to Ahipara, Mangonui and Pukenui.

Kaitaia Airport has services from Auckland and is the only airport in the upper Far North District. Air New Zealand discontinued their services in April 2015. Barrier Air has since taken over services to Auckland.

Economy

Tourism 
Kaitaia is one of the main centres in the Far North of New Zealand. It is near to popular tourist destinations such as Ahipara and is on State Highway 1 which leads up to Cape Reinga. The town's slogan is "Where journeys begin".

An annual Snapper Surf Casting Competition is held in March, on Te Oneroa-a-Tōhē (90 Mile Beach).

Forestry 
The Aupouri Forest, to the North of Kaitaia, provides pine logs which are processed at the Juken Nissho Mill in Kaitaia.

Extraction of ancient swamp Kauri (Agathis australis), is a contentious industry.

Agriculture, horticulture and viticulture
Kaitaia lies within the Awanui River catchment. The area supports dairy and dry stock farming, predominantly sheep and beef. Further north of Kaitaia, the avocado industry flourishes, with orchards dispersed throughout the immediate area.

Wine is a growing commodity. One of the largest vineyards in the area is the Karikari Estate.

Mānuka honey is another industry experiencing growth.

Education
Kaitaia Primary School, Kaitaia Intermediate and Kaitaia College are the main primary, intermediate and secondary schools.

It is a Kura Kaupapa Māori school which teaches fully in the Māori language.

It was established in 1988 as a private primary school, and extended to secondary students in 1992. It became a state integrated school in 1996.

All these schools are co-educational. Rolls are as of 

NorthTec polytechnic also has a campus in Kaitaia.

Notable people
Notable people who have lived in Kaitaia:
 Nopera Pana-kareao (?–1856) tribal leader, evangelist and assessor
 Margaret MacPherson née Kendall (1895–1974), journalist
 Sophia Taylor née Davis (1847–1930), hostess, suffragist and landowner in Mount Albert, Auckland
 Donald Rutledge O.B.E, J.P. (1891–1956), small business owner, founding members of Kaitaia RSA, member of Kaitaia Town Board. Invested with the OBE for services to the community
Mike Burgoyne (rugby union), All Black - born in Kaitaia
Peter Jones (New Zealand rugby union), All Black - born in Kaitaia
Victor Yates (rugby), All Black - born in Kaitaia
Shelley Kitchen, squash player, commonwealth and world championship medalist - born in Kaitaia
Lance O'Sullivan (doctor) - worked in Kaitaia 2012?-2018

References

Ramsay, Olwyn. In the Shadow of Maungataniwha.

External links

 Kaitaia Online
https://www.nzgeo.com/stories/far-north-tail-of-the-fish/ New Zealand Geographic
https://nzhistory.govt.nz/keyword/kaitaia
Awanui River flood protection works  - New Zealand Herald Article

Far North District
Populated places in the Northland Region